Dasyam Vinay Bhaskar (Telugu: డి వినయ భాస్కేర్) (born 22 November 1964) is an Indian politician and Member of Legislative Assembly in Telangana representing Telangana Rashtra Samithi a.k.a. T.R.S. and Government Chief Whip of Telangana State Legislative Assembly. He represents the Warangal West assembly constituency. He was also the Parliamentary Secretary in-charge of Chief Minister's Office (CMO) for TRS party during 2015.

Early life
Vinay Bhaskar was born in Warangal district, Andhra Pradesh now Telangana, India. He is the younger brother of Dasyam Pranay Bhasker who was a former cabinet minister in the TDP government of N. T. Rama Rao. After the death of his elder brother, Vinay Bhaskar followed him into politics.

He completed his 12th from St. Joseph Jr. College, Hyderabad and graduated in Bachelor of Arts in political science from Dr. BR Ambedkar Open University, Hyderabad.

Career
In 2004 Vinay Bhaskar contested as Independent candidate from Hanamkonda (Assembly constituency) and lost to Mandadi Satyanarayana Reddy of TRS party after coming second.
Later he joined Telangana Rastra Samithi TRS on the invitation of KCR and was elected as a corporator which is the first elected representation for him. In 2009 Vinay Bhaskar was elected to Warangal West constituency in Warangal district representing Telangana Rashtra Samithi and won the seat again in 2014. He is currently on his third term and earlier won the 2009 and 2010 (By-polls) in United Andhra Pradesh and winning 2014 elections after Telangana was granted statehood. Again in 2011 by-election he was elected. In 2018 polls Vinay Bhaskar won from Warangal West for the second time.

In January 2015 he was appointed Parliamentary Secretary in-charge of Chief Minister's Office (CMO) by chief Minister of Telangana.

On 8 September 2019, Vinay Bhaskar was appointed the Government Chief Whip for Telangana Legislative assembly.

Elections contested

References

Telugu politicians
Telangana Rashtra Samithi politicians
Living people
People from Warangal
Telangana MLAs 2014–2018
1964 births